Ladner may refer to:

Places
 Ladner, British Columbia, Canada, a suburb of Vancouver
 Canadian Forces Station Ladner, former name of the Boundary Bay Airport in British Columbia
 Canadian Forces Station Ladner, former military airport
 Ladner Elementary School, British Columbia
 Ladner Leisure Centre, a recreation centre located in Delta, British Columbia
 Ladner, South Dakota, United States, an unincorporated community

People
 Ladner (surname)

Fiction
 A sleepy community that is the fictional setting of the television series Impastor

See also
 Borden Ladner Gervais, Canadian law firm